Filhaal... is a Bollywood film released in 2002 directed by Meghna Gulzar(in her feature directorial debut). It stars Sushmita Sen, Tabu, Sanjay Suri and Palash Sen. Meghna Gulzar, daughter of lyricist Gulzar and actress Raakhee, made her directorial debut with the film. The film was critically well received, especially the performance of Sushmita Sen, won was nominated for Filmfare Award for Best Supporting Actress.

Synopsis 
Rewa Singh and Sia Sheth are best friends. Having grown up together, the pair are inseparable and are always there for each other. However, they are very different when it comes to what they want from life. Rewa is a family-oriented girl; she does not have any boyfriend, and is committed to building her own stable family after marriage. Sia is very different; she has a roaring sex-life and a boyfriend, Sahil, who has proposed marriage to her twice, but she has turned him down, saying that her career is more important at present, and she will think of marriage later. Yet, Sahil is determined to marry her and nobody else.

Through her family, Rewa meets Dhruv and marries him. Both of them want to start a family, but they soon find out that Rewa unable to conceive. Rewa is devastated, Dhruv is very supportive but himself upset at the news. Indeed, Dhruv's stoicism and nobility make Rewa feel even more incomplete and empty, and she slowly sinks into depression.

Sia cannot bear to see her friend like this and offers a solution – she offers to become a surrogate mother to their child. Dhruv is astonished at the idea and opposed to it at first. However, Rewa's insistence sways him and he agrees. When Sia tells Sahil what she intends to do, he is horrified at the idea and strongly opposes Sia bearing someone else's child, pointing to various problems, including the probability of Sia's own future emotional complications. As usual, Sia disregards Sahil's views and wishes and goes ahead with doing exactly what she wants to do. This is too much for even the ever-docile Sahil, and he breaks off the relationship with Sia.

Sia soon becomes pregnant and gives birth to a beautiful baby girl. Rewa and Dhruv do everything to make sure that Sia takes care of herself and the baby stays healthy. However, cracks between Rewa and Sia begin to surface. Rewa is jealous that Dhruv is spending more time with Sia and is frustrated as she is not able to experience the joy of carrying a child. Rewa begins to lash out at Sia and at times insults her. Things come to a halt when Sia decorates the baby's room while Rewa yells at her, telling her that the baby is not hers and she should now go away.

Luckily, after some time things calm down and all of them come to terms with reality. Sia hands over the baby to Rewa and Dhruv, who move far, far away, and it is clear that Rewa and Sia will have little or nothing to do with each other in future. Sahil rekindles his relationship with Sia and again proposes marriage. This time, she accepts.

Cast 
 Tabu as Rewa Singh
 Sushmita Sen as Sia Sheth
 Sanjay Suri as Dhruv Malhotra
 Palash Sen as Sahil
 Amar Mohanty as Murli

Soundtrack

The Music and Background score was composed by Anu Malik. The background score was composed by Anjan Biswas. All the lyrics were penned by Gulzar. The album opened to positive reviews and Planet Bollywood rated 9/10. The tracklist featured 6 songs and one instrumental sung by eminent singers like Asha Bhosle, K.S.Chithra, KK and others. All the songs were hit tracks, but the tracks "Filhaal", "Kyun Baar Baar" & "Naya Naya" were considered to be chartbusters.

Critical response
Dinesh Raheja of Rediff.com wrote ″As I shuffled my feet while making way out of the theatre, the first thought after watching Filhaal was: It would be interesting to see what Meghna Gulzar could do with a fresher subject. She has promise. All she needs is a more original premise.″ Radhika Rajamani of The Hindu wrote ″he feel is modern- production wise it is slick. Anu Malik's music is good but too many songs detract the narrative. Manmohan Singh's camera is able to capture the myriad hues of life and color well. Performances on the mainstay of the film. The casting is certainly appropriate. It goes without saying that Tabu has done well. But it is the sterling performance (best up to date) of Sushmita Sen, which endears. Sanjay Suri and Palash Sen fit in well. An earnest attempt.″  Manish Gajjar of BBC.com wrote ″This is one of the very few classy movies from Bollywood which has been made with great intellect, style and conviction! It is a definite must-see!″

Tiasa Bhowal in her retrospective review for India Today wrote ″Filhaal was a breath of fresh air, but the audience of almost two decades ago was not ready to accept a film that tried to normalise surrogacy, something that was considered taboo. Despite the film garnering appreciation from the critics, the response at the box office was lukewarm.″

References

External links
 

2002 films
2000s Hindi-language films
Films scored by Anu Malik
2002 directorial debut films